The mock trumpet is a single-reed woodwind instrument popular during the second half of the seventeenth century, especially in England.  By the 1720s, the mock trumpet was documented in use in the New World.

The mock trumpet predated the chalumeau and may be one of the primary predecessors of both the chalumeau and  clarinet. Thurston Dart wrote that the mock trumpet was the name for the chalumeau in England, and that music was published for it in 1698. 

Mock trumpets are keyless reed-pipes, closed on one end by the natural joint of the cane and wrapped in leather.  The reed is idioglottal, meaning that it is a tongue cut but not detached from the reed itself.  The reed was placed on the upper side of the instrument and vibrated against the upper lip; the pipe had six tone holes on top and one in the back.  Early chalmeaus used idioglot reeds, as shown in the debate as to whether to install reeds up or down. Rice said the idioglot reed was installed with the split going from the top downward (anaglott).

Documented music for the mock trumpet primarily includes tutors and method books, indicating that this was an instrument studied in the Western Classical tradition.

Tuning
The instrument as played in England was in the key of G. Content from The Fourth Compleat Book for the Mock Trumpet, "published between November 1706 and October 1708" showed the available notes to be  G4, A4, B4, C5, D5, E5, F5, G5. (Converted to scientific pitch notation.) While this is almost a diatonic scale in G major,  it would need an F# for that. Rather this is C major, with the music included written in that scale.

References

Single-reed instruments